Damon Fox (born May 17, 1966) is an American writer. His works as a screenwriter include Traces of Death (1993) and Traces of Death II (1994).

Early life
Fox was born in Phoenix, Arizona in 1966. He claims to have written and directed plays during childhood. In High School, he wrote and directed original plays.

Career
During the 1990s, Fox formed Foxx Entertainment Enterprises Inc. With this production company, he created, scripted and narrated the shockumentary films Traces of Death I and II.

Selected filmography

Self
 Traces of Death (1993) - Narrator, host
 Traces of Death II (1994) - Narrator
 The Coroner's Camera (1997) - Narrator

Producer
 Traces of Death (1993) - Co-executive producer
 Traces of Death II (1994) - Co-executive producer
 The Coroner's Camera (1997) - Producer

Writer
 Traces of Death (1993) 
 Traces of Death II (1994)
 The Coroner's Camera (1997)

Composer
 The Coroner's Camera (1997) 
 The Kid & I (2005)

Director
 The Coroner's Camera (1997)

References

External links

1966 births
Living people